Acropoma lecorneti is a species of ray-finned fish, a lanternbelly from the family Acropomatidae. It is found in the western Pacific Ocean where it has been recorded off  Japan and New Caledonia. The specific name honours the skipper of the fishing boat Thalassa, Monsieur Lecornet, who took the type aboard that vessel.

References

lecorneti
Fish described in 1988